Roger Smith (born May 21, 1951) is a Canadian journalist. From 1994 until his retirement in 2013, he was a reporter for CTV Ottawa primarily focusing on federal politics. Smith began his career in journalism as a print reporter with The Canadian Press, then joined CTV Ottawa in 1984 and took over the Beijing bureau in 1985. His career has landed him in Europe, Asia as well as Africa. He is married to writer Denise Chong, with whom he has two children.

Born in St. Catharines, Ontario, Smith received a Gemini Award nomination in 1989 for Best Reportage, for "China in Turmoil".

References

Sources
 CTV biography
 CTV biography

1951 births
Canadian male journalists
Canadian television reporters and correspondents
Journalists from Ontario
Living people
People from St. Catharines